The Elusive Pimpernel is a 1919 British silent adventure film directed by Maurice Elvey and starring Cecil Humphreys, Marie Blanche and Norman Page. It was based on the 1908 novel The Elusive Pimpernel by Baroness Orczy.

Plot
A foppish English aristocrat secretly rescues people from the guillotine during the French Revolution.

Cast
 Cecil Humphreys - Sir Percy Blakeney
 Marie Blanche - Lady Blakeney
 Norman Page - Chauvelin
 A.C. Fotheringham-Lysons - Robespierre
 Teddy Arundell - Colet d'Herbois
 Madge Stuart - Juliette Marny
 A. Harding Steerman - Abbe Jouquet
 Dorothy Hanson - Mlle. Cardeille

References

External links

1919 films
British silent feature films
British historical adventure films
1910s English-language films
Films directed by Maurice Elvey
1910s historical adventure films
Films set in England
Films set in France
Films set in the 1790s
Scarlet Pimpernel films
British black-and-white films
Films based on works by Emma Orczy
Cultural depictions of Maximilien Robespierre
1910s British films
Silent historical adventure films